Chôros is the title of a series of compositions by the Brazilian composer Heitor Villa-Lobos, composed between 1920 and 1929.

Origin and conception
The word chôro (nowadays spelled simply choro) is Portuguese for "weeping", "cry", and came to be the name used for music played by an ensemble of Brazilian street musicians (called chorões) using both African and European instruments, who improvise in a free and often dissonant kind of counterpoint called contracanto. In this context, the term does not refer to any definite form of composition, but rather includes a variety of Brazilian types. Villa-Lobos described the basic concept of his Chôros as a "brasilofonia"—an extension of the popular street-musicians' chôro to a pan-Brazilian synthesis of native folklore, both Indian and popular.

The tenth work in the series is for mixed choir and large orchestra, and quotes at length from a popular song, originally composed as an instrumental schottische, Yará, in 1896 by Anacleto de Medeiros. In 1907, Catullo da Paixão Cearense transformed it into a popular song by adding words to the melody, retitling it "Rasga o coração" ("Rend Your Heart"). The Villa-Lobos work bears this phrase as a subtitle.

History
The series of Chôros was composed between 1920 and 1929, but the pieces were not all composed in numerical order. Sometimes, when Villa-Lobos was working on one piece in the series, an idea would occur to him for another that seemed to him to belong much further along, and so he would compose a new Chôros around that rhythm or theme and assign it a higher number, in the expectation of writing pieces to go in between. For example, whereas Chôros no. 7 was written in 1924, the Chôros 3, 4, 5, and 6 were not composed until 1925 and 1926, and the Introdução aos Chôros (Introduction to the Chôros) was written only in 1929.

The Chôros series
Introdução aos Chôros: Abertura (Introduction aux chôros: Ouverture), for guitar and orchestra (1929) [2 piccolos, 2 flutes, 2 oboes, English horn, 2 clarinets, bass clarinet, alto saxophone, 2 bassoons, contrabassoon, 4 horns, 4 trumpets, 4 trombones, tuba, timpani, tam-tam, prato, celesta, xylophone, piano, 2 harps, guitar (with microphone), violins I, violins II, viola, cellos, double basses] or [piccolo, 2 flutes, 2 oboes, English horn, 2 clarinets, bass clarinet, saxophone, 2 bassoons, contrabassoon, 4 horns, tuba, timpani, tam-tam, xylophone, celesta, 2 harps, piano, strings]
No. 1 for guitar (1920)
No. 2 for flute and clarinet (1924)
No. 3 for male chorus or seven wind instruments, or both together (1925) "Pica-páo" (Woodpecker) [Male chorus (2 tenor, baritone, bass), clarinet, alto saxophone, bassoon, 3 horns, trombone]
No. 4 for 3 horns and trombone (1926)
No. 5 for piano (1925) "Alma brasileira" (Brazilian Soul)
No. 6 for orchestra (1926) [piccolo, 2 flutes, 2 oboes, English horn, clarinet, bass clarinet, 2 bassoons, contrabassoon, 4 horns, 3 trumpets, 4 trombones, tuba, timpani, tam-tam, saxophone, xylophone, bells, cymbals, bass, drum, celesta, 2 harps, strings, and other percussion instruments]
No. 7 for winds, violin, and cello (1924) "Settimino" (Septet) [flute, oboe, clarinet, alto saxophone, bassoon, tam-tam (ad lib.), violin, cello]
No. 8 for large orchestra and 2 pianos (1925) "Dance Chôro" [piccolo, 2 flutes, 2 oboes, English horn, 4 clarinets. bass clarinet, saxophone, 2 bassoons, contrabassoon, 4 horns, 4 trumpets, 4 trombones, tuba, timpani, tam-tam, xylophone, triangle, other percussion instruments, cymbals, celesta, 2 harps, strings]
No. 9 for orchestra (1929) [Piccolo, 2 flutes, 2 oboes, English horn, 3 clarinets, bass clarinet, 2 bassoons, contrabassoon, 4 horns, 4 trumpets, 4 trombones, tuba, timpani, tam-tam, bombo, tambor, tambor surdo, camisao (large and small), pio, triangle, reco, tartaruga, cax, cho (metal and wood), xylophone, vibraphone, celesta, 2 harps and strings]
No. 10 for chorus and orchestra (1925) "Rasga o coração" (It Tears Your Heart) [piccolo, 2 flutes, 2 oboes, 2 clarinets, saxophone, 2 bassoons, contrabassoon, 3 horns, 2 trumpets, 2 trombones, 2 timpani, tam-tam, tambourine, tambor, caxambu, 2 puitas, surdo, drums, reco-reco (large and small), chocalhos de metal e de madeira, piano, harp, strings]
No. 11 for piano and orchestra (1928) [piccolo, 3 flutes, 2 oboes, English horn, 2 clarinets, bass clarinet, soprano saxophone, alto saxophone, requinta, 2 bassoons, contrabassoon, 4 horns, 4 trumpets, 4 trombones, tuba, timpani, tam-tam, reco-reco, chocalhos, xylophone, bells, tambor, bombo, cymbals, tambourine, celesta, 2 harps, strings, piano]
No. 12 for orchestra (1929) [2 piccolos, 3 flutes, 3 oboes, English horn, 3 clarinets, bass clarinet, 2 saxophones, 3 bassoons, contrabassoon, 8 horns, 4 trumpets, 4 trombones, tuba, timpani, tam-tam, cymbals, cuica, bombo, xylophone, tambor, celesta, 2 harps, piano, strings]
No. 13 for band and 2 orchestras (1929) – score lost, except for a short-score fragment consisting of the first page of a piano reduction, held by the Museu Villa-Lobos.
No. 14 for orchestra, band, and chorus (1928) – score lost
Chôros bis, for violin and cello (1928–29)

Notes

References

Further reading
Appleby, David P. 1988. Heitor Villa-Lobos: A Bio-Bibliography. New York: Greenwood Press. 
Béhague, Gerard. 1994. Villa-Lobos: The Search for Brazil's Musical Soul. Austin: Institute of Latin American Studies, University of Texas at Austin, 1994. 
 Béhague, Gerard. 2001. "Villa-Lobos, Heitor". The New Grove Dictionary of Music and Musicians, edited by Stanley Sadie and John Tyrrell. London: Macmillan.
Boéssio, José Pedro. 1996. "Razão ou sensibilidade? O estudo, a pesquisa e a execução: Choros n. 10—Gesto musical na modernidade brasileira: Elementos de análise visando uma interpretação". In IX encontro anual da ANPPOM, edited by Martha de Ulhôa and José Maria Neves, 113–20. Rio de Janeiro: Associação Nacional de Pesquisa e Pós-Graduação em Música (ANPPOM).
 Boff, Ruy Celso. 1988. "Les choros de Heitor Villa Lobos, 1887–1959". PhD Thesis. Université de Louvain.
 Bordini, Ricardo Mazzini. 2006. "Heitor Villa-Lobos, Choros (No. 10), 'Rasga o Coração' ou Jurupari: coletânea de citações e uma discussão dos aspectos motívicos e formais da obra". Ictus: Periódico do Programa de Pós-Graduação em Música da UFBA 7:87–94.
 Demarquez, Suzanne. 1929a. "Les Choros de Villa-Lobos". Musique: Revue mensuelle de critique, d'histoire, d'esthétique et d'information musicales, No. 4 (15 January): 707–13.
 Demarquez, Suzanne. 1929b. "Villa-Lobos". Revue Musicale 10, no. 10 (November): 1–22.
 Gaertner, Leandro. 2008. "Análise para intérpretes do Choros 2 de Heitor Villa-Lobos". Música hodie 8, no. 2 (July–December): 53–81.
 Gomes Filho, Tarcísio, and Mauricy Martin. 2006. "Aspectos do idioma pianístico de Villa-Lobos na peça Choros no. 5: Alma brasileira". Revista eletrônica de musicologia/Electronic musicological review 10.
 Harrison, Lou. 1945. "On the Chôros of Villa-Lobos". Modern Music 22, no. 2 (January–February): 85–87.
 Lacerda, Marcos Branda. 2014. "Villa-Lobos, os Choros e o Pestana às avessas". Opus: Revista da Associação Nacional de Pesquisa e Pós-Graduação em Música (ANPPOM) 20, no. 2:77–98.
 Moreira, Gabriel Ferrão. 2014. "A construção da sonoridade modernista de Heitor Villa-Lobos por meio de processos harmônicos: Um estudo sobre Choros". DMus diss. São Paulo: Universidade de São Paulo, Escola de Comunicações e Artes. 
 Neves, José Maria. 1977. Villa-Lobos, o choro e Os choros. São Paulo, Brasil: Musicália S/A.
 Neves, José Maria. 1987. "Villa-Lobos e os choros". Revista Brasileira de Música 17:67–72.
 Nóbrega, Adhemar Alves da. 1975. Os chôros de Villa-Lobos. Rio de Janeiro: Museu Villa-Lobos.
 Ogata, Denise Mayumi. 2014. "Choros n. 7, de Heitor Villa-Lobos: análise musical". XXIV Congresso da Associação Nacional de Pesquisa e Pós-Graduação em Música – São Paulo. 
 Pantano, Marina. 1992. "Esotismo e folklore negli Chorus  de Villa-Lobos". In Esotismo e scuole nazionali: Itinerari musicali tra l'Europa e le Americhe, edited by Armando Menicacci and Johannes Streicher, 41–53. Rome: Logos.
 Peppercorn, Lisa M. 1980. "A Villa-Lobos Autograph Letter at the Bibliothèque Nationale (Paris)". Latin American Music Review / Revista de Música Latinoamericana 1, no. 2 (Autumn–Winter): 253–64.
 Peppercorn, Lisa M. 1991. Villa-Lobos, the Music: An Analysis of His Style, translated by Stefan De Haan. London: Kahn & Averill; White Plains, NY: Pro/AM Music Resources. .
 Seixas, Guilherme Bernstein. 2000. "Ostinato e estrutura formal no choro no. 6 de Heitor Villa-Lobos". In Anais do 1º Colóquio de Pesquisa da Pós-Graduação, edited by Marisa Rezende and Mário Nogueira, 65–70. Rio de Janeiro: Universidade Federal do Rio de Janeiro.
 Seixas, Guilherme Bernstein. 2001. "Texture and Harmonic Language in the Choros no. 6 of Heitor Villa-Lobos". In Anais do 2º Colóquio de Pesquisa da Pós-Graduação, edited by Maria de Fátima Granja Tacuchian, 30–37. Rio de Janeiro: Universidade Federal do Rio de Janeiro.
 Seixas, Guilherme Bernstein. 2007. "Procedimentos Composicionais nos Choros Orquestrais de Heitor Villa-Lobos". PhD diss. Rio de Janeiro: Universidade Federal do Estado de Rio de Janeiro.
 Seixas, Guilherme Bernstein. 2009. "Os choros e as Bachianas como princípios composicionais". Brasiliana: Revista quadrimestral da Academia Brasileira de Música, no. 29 (August): 21–28.
 Tarasti, Eero. Heitor Villa-Lobos: The Life and Works. Jefferson, North Carolina: McFarland. 
 Villa-Lobos, Heitor. 1974. "Choros:—Estudo técnico, estético e psicológico de Villa-Lobos", revised by Prof. Adhemar Nóbrega at the CNCO in 1950. In Villa-Lobos, sua obra, second edition, edited by Museu Villa-Lobos, Programa de Ação Cultural, 198–210. Rio de Janeiro: MEC, DAC, Museu Villa-Lobos.
 Wade, Graham. 1998. "Un approccio al choros n. 1 di Heitor Villa-Lobos". Il Fronimo: Rivista di chitarra 26, no. 103 (July–September): 41–49. Also published as "Annäherung an Choros no. 1 von Heitor Villa-Lobos", translated by Leo Freitag. Gitarre & Laute 20, no. 1 (January–February 1998) 15–19.
 Wright, Simon. 1979. "Villa-Lobos: The Formation of His Style". Soundings: A Music Journal (Cardiff) 8:55–70.
 Wright, Simon. 1992. Villa-Lobos. Oxford and New York: Oxford University Press. 
 Zigante, Frédéric. 2006. "Valse-Chôro: Un inedito per chitarra di Heitor Villa-Lobos". Il Fronimo: Rivista di chitarra 34, no. 134 (April–June): 22–27.

Compositions by Heitor Villa-Lobos
Cycles (music)